Stephen M. Levin (October 16, 1941 – February 7, 2012) was the medical director of the Mount Sinai Irving J. Selikoff Center for Occupational and Environmental Medicine, a professor of occupational medicine at the Mount Sinai School of Medicine, and the co-director of the World Trade Center Worker and Volunteer Medical Screening Program.  A graduate of Wesleyan University and then New York University School of Medicine, Levin was born and raised in Philadelphia to working-class parents—his father a carpenter, his mother a hospital worker.  He was recognized worldwide as a leader in the field of occupational medicine, particularly due to his work on behalf of 9/11 workers and those injured by asbestos in the town of Libby, Montana.

Career

Levin was a 1967 graduate of the New York University School of Medicine.   Levin then spent a decade practicing general medicine in the working class town of Pottstown, Pennsylvania.  Following this formative experience, he came to Mount Sinai to receive his training in occupational medicine. Following completion of his training, he joined the Mount Sinai faculty. He spent the remainder of his career at Mount Sinai, rose through the academic ranks and was promoted to full professor in 2011.

Levin became medical director of the Mount Sinai Selikoff Center in 1987 . He was active in the occupational medicine teaching program for medical students and residents. His research interests focused on asbestos-related disease, other occupational lung diseases and heavy metal toxicity.

Levin served as a consultant to the New York State, New Jersey, and New York City Departments of Health on the health hazards of environmental pollutants. 
In the 1990s, Levin helped ensure that federal and New York State authorities required the provision of respirators and vacuum hoses to protect bridge workers from lead poisoning
In 2000 and 2004, Levin's research and testimony helped convict Joseph Thorn and father and son Alexander and Raul Salvagno, owners of asbestos abatement companies in New York. The Salvagnos secretly co-owned a lab that produced 75,000 fraudulent laboratory analysis results on asbestos levels. 
Levin was one of the two primary investigators for a project on asbestos exposure among electrical power generation workers in Puerto Rico.
Levin was also the primary investigator for a project on Libby, Montana, a mining town where thousands of workers and residents had been exposed to asbestos-contaminated vermiculite ore.

World Trade Center workers

Just days after the World Trade Center attacks, Levin and his colleagues started planning what would become the clinic for WTC responders.  Ninety percent of the 10,116 firefighters and other responders reported an acute cough within the first 48 hours, as a study the clinic put out three years later would document.   The clinic, which received more than $12 million from the government, has already screened and treated more than 20,000 workers, and released over a dozen studies.  One 2006 study showed that approximately 30% of the patients screened (at that point, 12,000) suffered from chronic asthma and bronchitis, and 17% suffered from PTSD and depression.
Levin was instrumental in passage of the James Zadroga 9/11 Health and Compensation Act.  This legislation is designed to ensure that the 911 first responders are provided with basic medical care needed as a result of their toxic exposures.

See also
Official Stephen M. Levin MD memorial website
Obituary, The Lancet, March 31, 2012
Stephen M. Levin honored with Selikoff award, Collegium Ramazzini (scroll down)
New York Daily News, Health and Compensation Act, February 9, 2012]

NYNJERC 30th Annual Scientific Meeting presentation on Historical Aspects of Asbestos on YouTube

References

1941 births
2012 deaths
Wesleyan University alumni
New York University Grossman School of Medicine alumni
Physicians from Philadelphia
Icahn School of Medicine at Mount Sinai faculty